Tingena pharmactis is a species of moth in the family Oecophoridae. It is endemic to New Zealand and has been observed in the Nelson, Tasman and Wellington regions. The adults of this species are on the wing in December.

Taxonomy 
This species was first described in 1905 by Edward Meyrick using a specimen he collected in January at the Mount Arthur tableland at 4000 ft.  Meyrick originally named this species Borkhausenia pharmactis. In 1915 Meyrick discussed this species under the name Borkhausenia pharmactis. In 1926 Alfred Philpott discussed and illustrated the genitalia of the male of this species. In 1928 George Hudson also discussed and illustrated this species in his book The butterflies and moths of New Zealand. In 1988 J. S. Dugdale placed this species within the genus Tingena. The female holotype is held at the Natural History Museum, London.

Description 

Meyrick described the species as follows:

Distribution 
This species is endemic to New Zealand. It has been observed in the Nelson/Tasman regions at Mount Arthur and at the Cobb Valley as well as in the Wellington region at Kapiti Island.

Behaviour 
The adults of this species are on the wing in December.

References

Oecophoridae
Moths of New Zealand
Moths described in 1905
Endemic fauna of New Zealand
Taxa named by Edward Meyrick
Endemic moths of New Zealand